Rogers Building can refer to:

Rogers Building (Toronto), Canada, the corporate head office of Rogers Communications
Rogers Building (Victoria, British Columbia), a historic site
Rogers Building (Florida), a historic site in Orlando, Florida
Col. Matthew Rogers Building, Athens, Illinois
Rogers Building (MIT), the first building built for the Massachusetts Institute of Technology, in Back Bay, Boston, and also a later replacement MIT building in Cambridge, Massachusetts